Édouard-Thomas de Burgues, comte de Missiessy (23 April 1756, Forcalquier, Alpes-de-Haute-Provence – 24 March 1837, Toulon) was a French naval officer and admiral. He joined the navy in April 1766, as a volunteer aboard his father's ship and spent most of his early service in the Mediterranean, in the frigates of the Toulon Fleet. When France entered the American Revolutionary war, Missiessy joined the 64-gun Vaillant in Admiral d'Estaing's fleet, where he took part in the initial engagements off Newport, St Lucia and Grenada, and in September 1779, the failed attack on Savannah. Missiessy's first command came in 1782 when he was promoted to lieutenant de vaisseau of the cutter Le Pygmée. He was soon after captured by the British but later released in an exchange of prisoners.

In 1789, the year of the outbreak of the French Revolution, Missiessy was a frigate commander in the Mediterranean. Promoted to capitaine de vaisseau in January 1792, he received the command of the  ship Centaure in Admiral Truguet's squadron. In January 1793, he was promoted to contre-amiral. The Revolution became more radical and Missiessy was arrested on 21 May 1793 for being of noble birth. He was released and returned to duty on 30 June but when Toulon declared for the King, Missiessy fled to Italy. He did not return to France until 1795 and despite being acquitted by a court of enquiry, he was not given a ship and spent the next six years working ashore.

In 1804, Missiessy was appointed commander-in-chief of the Rochefort squadron with a key role in Napoleon's planned invasion of the United Kingdom. The Rochefort squadron was intended to rendezvous with Villeneuve's fleet in the West Indies and draw British ships there, before racing back across the Atlantic and seizing control of the English Channel. The failure of this plan was blamed in part on Missiessy and he was dismissed from the service. He was not employed again until February 1808 when he was made Commander-in-Chief of the defences at the Scheldt, foiling the British attacks on Antwerp that occurred between July and September 1809. Missiessy ceased active service on 17 September 1824 and was officially acknowledged as retired on 23 April 1832, when his name was entered on the retirement list. He died at Toulon on 24 March 1837, aged 80.

Early life and career
Édouard-Thomas de Burgues, comte de Missiessy was born on 23 April 1756, in Forcalquier, Alpes-de-Haute-Provence. He joined the navy in April 1766, at the age of 10, as a volunteer aboard his father's ship, Altier.
Most of his early service was spent in the Mediterranean, aboard the frigates of the Toulon Fleet. In April 1773, while a Garcon-Major on the Engageante, he embarked on a lengthy cruise to the Levant which lasted until January 1774. Another 9 month trip to the Levant took place between May 1774 and February 1775. Missiessy undertook a third cruise to the Levant between October 1775 and September 1776, this time as a Garde du Pavillon aboard the frigate Flore. Missiessy was promoted to enseigne de vaisseau in April 1777 and joined Sultane for an expedition to the Barbary Coast, where he helped prevent attacks on French shipping by corsairs.

During  the American War of Independence, he served Admiral d'Estaing's fleet. Aboard the 64-gun Vaillant, Missiessy participated in initial engagements off Newport, St Lucia and Grenada, and in September 1779 took part in the failed attack on Savannah. In December, Missiessy sailed for Lorient but by February the following year, he was on his way back to America in the 32-gun frigate, Surveillante.

Command
Missiessy was promoted to lieutenant de vaisseau on 9 May 1781 and returned to France in December 1781. He received his first command in March 1782, the cutter Le Pygmée, stationed at Brest but was shortly after captured by the British on 27 July 1782. Briefly confined at Deal, Kent, he was exchanged and by September, was serving as second officer aboard the 64-gun Reflechi. In early February 1783, he joined the 74-gun Censeur, returning home in April. From May 1786, Missiessy commanded transport ships operating in the Baltic.

Imprisonment and exile

The French Revolution broke out in May 1789 and Missiessy spent August through to January 1792 in the Mediterranean, where he commanded the frigates Belette and Modeste. Promoted to capitaine de vaisseau in January 1791, he received the command of the  ship Centaure in Admiral Truguet's squadron. In January 1793, he was promoted to contre-amiral. However, the Revolution was becoming more radical and Missiessy was suspected of noble birth and opposing the new regime. He was sent ashore and arrested on 21 May 1793 but was released and returned to duty on 30 June.

When Toulon revolted, declaring for King Louis XVII and inviting the British in, Missiessy abandoned his command and fled to Italy. He returned to France in May 1795, where he faced a court of enquiry. On 25 August, Missiessy was acquitted and released. He was not given another ship however and instead served at the department of Charts and Maps, in Paris, until 1796, then as Director of the School of Naval Construction for four years after.

In June 1801, Missiessy's old commander, Truget, requested him as his Chief of Staff for the combined French and Spanish fleet stationed at Cadiz but when peace was declared in March 1802, he was ordered back to Paris and made Maritime Prefect. This was one of the first appointments of its kind, with responsibility for port facilities and fleet services. It was soon after decided to create similar positions for all French naval bases and in July, Missiessy took the job at the port of Le Havre.

West Indies

Truget called upon Missiessy again in October 1801, when he needed someone to command a squadron of ships at Brest. Missiessy held the post until  10 September 1804, when he was appointed commander-in-chief of the Rochefort squadron. The Rochefort squadron was a key element in Napoleon's planned invasion of the United Kingdom; intended to rendezvous with Villeneuve's fleet in the West Indies and draw British ships there, before racing back across the Atlantic and seizing control of the English Channel. On 11 January 1805 the blockading British ships were blown off station, allowing Missiessy's force to escape. Aboard the five ships-of-the-line, three frigates and two corvettes were 3500 troops under General Joseph Lagrange and artillery, supplies and weapons to reinforce the French garrisons of Martinique, Guadeloupe and Saint-Domingue. The same wind that disrupted the British blockade, kept the French ships pinned to the coast for five days, delaying arrival in Martinique until 20 February.

The approach to Martinique was guarded by a British battery mounted on Diamond Rock, forcing visiting ships to make a long detour through unfavourable open sea with strong winds and currents. HMS Diamond Rock, as it had been impudently named by those occupying it, was a constant irritation to Napoleon and Missiessy was keen to expel the British from it. He could not, however, convince either Lagrange or the Captain-General of Martinique, Villaret-Joyeuse, of the merits of his proposal. It was agreed instead to attack the British held island of Dominica. The assault began on 22 February but the small British contingent, outnumbered three to one, fought fiercely and when the French failed to capture Prince Rupert Fort, they left on 25 February, destroying and burning as much as they could on the way.

On 28 February, Missiesy transported reinforcements and supplies to Guadeloupe. Between 5 and 10 March Missiessy's force attacked the British colonies of St Kitts, Nevis and Montserrat, collecting £25,000 in ransom money in the process. Returning to Martinique, Missiessy discovered that he and his squadron had been ordered home and that Napoleon's invasion plan had been postponed. Missiessy dropped the remaining troops at Saint-Dominique and set sail for France, arriving in Rochefort on 20 May. Despite carrying out his orders in full, Missiessy was made a scapegoat for Pierre-Charles Villeneuve's failings and lambasted by Napoleon for not recapturing Diamond Rock. He was dismissed and command of the Rochefort squadron passed to his second-in-command, Zacharie Allemand.

Later career

In February 1808, having been unemployed since his return from the West Indies, Missiessy was given command of the Scheldt squadron and successfully defended Antwerp from the British attacks that occurred between July and September 1809, part of the ill-fated Walcheren Campaign. Having already been promoted Vice-Admiral on 9 March, he was rewarded for his efforts with appointment to Commander-in-Chief of the Northern Coasts and made a Count of the Empire on 23 February 1811, the latter position coming with an annuity of 20,000 francs.

In August 1814, the restored French king, Louis XVIII awarded Missiessy the Grand Cross of the Legion of Honour. During the Hundred Days uprising, Missiessy avoided taking sides and was further rewarded following the Bourbon restoration in June 1815: He was Maritime Prefect of Toulon and was elevated to Commander-in-Chief there in January 1816, later serving on the Council of the Admiralty, and finally Commander-in-Chief of the navy.

Missiessy ceased active service on 17 September 1824. In June 1827, he was made a Knight Commander of the Holy Spirit and was officially acknowledged as retired on 23 April 1832, when his name was entered on the retirement list. He died at Toulon on 24 March 1837, aged 80.

References

1756 births
1837 deaths
People from Alpes-de-Haute-Provence
French Navy admirals
French naval commanders of the Napoleonic Wars
Grand Croix of the Légion d'honneur
Names inscribed under the Arc de Triomphe